Maharana Bhupal Stadium is a multipurpose stadium in  Udaipur, Rajasthan. The ground is mainly used for organizing matches of football, cricket and other sports. The stadium has hosted two Ranji Trophy matches in 1982 when Rajasthan cricket team played against Uttar Pradesh cricket team and again in 1983 when Rajasthan cricket team played against Vidarbha cricket team.

See also

 Maharana Pratap Khel Gaon
 Gandhi Ground
 Luv Kush Indoor Stadium
 Udaipur International Cricket Stadium

References

Buildings and structures in Udaipur
Multi-purpose stadiums in India
Cricket grounds in Rajasthan
Sports venues in Udaipur
Football venues in Rajasthan
Sports venues completed in 1982
1982 establishments in Rajasthan
20th-century architecture in India